Demukhino is a rural locality (a village) in Moshokskoye Rural Settlement, Sudogodsky District, Vladimir Oblast, Russia. The population was 21 as of 2010.

Geography 
Demukhino is located 45 km southeast of Sudogda (the district's administrative centre) by road. Gonobilovo is the nearest rural locality.

References 

Rural localities in Sudogodsky District